The India A cricket team toured New Zealand in November - December 2018 to play 3 first-class matches and 3 List-A matches against the New Zealand A cricket team. BCCI included Rohit Sharma, Murali Vijay and Ajinkya Rahane for India's first four-dayer match as a preparation for senior team's tour to Australia.

Squads 

Initially Rohit Sharma was selected for the first four-day match but was later rested because of constant workload. Hardik Pandya was selected for the limited overs series, but due to his slower-than expected recovery from his back injury, he was pulled out of the team and asked to prove his fitness in the Ranji Trophy.

First-Class series

1st Unofficial Test

2nd Unofficial Test

3rd Unofficial Test

List-A series

1st Unofficial ODI

2nd Unofficial ODI

3rd Unofficial ODI

References

External links
Series home at ESPN Cricinfo

2018–19 New Zealand cricket season
A team cricket